In November 2022, Saudi Arabia was hit by coastal flooding as a result of heavy rain. The main affected area was the city of Jeddah in which two people were killed. As a result, flights were delayed and schools were closed. The main road to Mecca was also closed.

On 23 December 2022, torrential rain caused flash flooding in Mecca. In the start of January 2023, Jeddah experienced further floods.

See also 
 2009 Jeddah floods

References 

2022 floods in Asia
Floods in Saudi Arabia
November 2022 events in Saudi Arabia
2022 disasters in Saudi Arabia
History of Jeddah
December 2022 events in Saudi Arabia
January 2023 events in Saudi Arabia
S